Nicholas Bishop (born 19 September 1973) is an English-born Australian actor. He is best known for his television roles as Detective Peter Baker on the soap opera Home and Away (2004–07) and as Peter Dunlop on the ABC medical drama Body of Proof (2011-2012).

Early life
Bishop was born in Swindon, England. His parents emigrated to Australia when he was six months old and the family settled in Canberra, Australian Capital Territory. His father was a former Australian Army officer and diplomat. Bishop attended Radford College in Canberra.

Bishop graduated from Australia's National Institute of Dramatic Art (NIDA) with a degree in performing arts (acting) in 1996, and has been a regular screen acting tutor there since 1997. He was a 2006 Australia Day Ambassador.

Career 
Bishop is most recognized by his role for four seasons as Detective Peter Baker in the Australian series Home and Away. In 2002, Bishop appeared in the critically acclaimed film Walking on Water. Additional television credits include Fox Past Life, Hustle, McLeod’s Daughters, Heartbreak High, Water Rats, Blue Heelers, Farscape, White Collar Blue and All Saints. He also starred in the movies The Sugar Factory (1998), Occasional Coarse Language (1998), My Mother Frank (2000), Punishment and The Land of the Astronauts (2010). In 2011, he guest starred in an episode of the USA Network series Necessary Roughness entitled "Anchor Management".

Bishop co-starred in the first two seasons of Dana Delany's medical drama television series Body of Proof in which he played medico-legal investigator Peter Dunlop, assistant to Medical Examiner Dr. Megan Hunt. In May 2011, it was announced that Body of Proof was renewed for a second season for the fall of 2011. He was written out of the show after two seasons. In June 2014 Bishop played Ryan McQuaid, a former Navy SEAL turned private contractor billionaire in Season 5 of Covert Affairs.

Personal life
Bishop resides in West Hollywood, California. In 2021, he got engaged to American actress Jes Macallan.

Filmography

References

External links
 

1973 births
Living people
Australian male soap opera actors
Australian male film actors
Australian male stage actors
Male actors from Canberra
Actors from Swindon
Male actors from Wiltshire
English emigrants to Australia
Australian expatriate male actors in the United States
National Institute of Dramatic Art alumni
20th-century Australian male actors
21st-century Australian male actors